Bandarwela Madya Maha Vidyalaya (Bandarawela Central College) is a public school in Uva province, Sri Lanka which was founded in 1942 as a section of Royal College Colombo. A national school, controlled by the central government (as opposed to the Provincial Council), it provides primary and secondary education. Bandarawela Central College has supplied many undergraduates from Badulla District to local universities.

History 
The foundation for the establishment of the college was laid by a Japanese bomb attack on Colombo during World War II. In 1942, Forms 1 to 3 of the Royal College, Colombo were moved to Glendale Bungalow in Bandarawela, where BCC stands today. In 1944, the Royal Preparatory School was also moved to the same place; in 1948, they were moved back to Colombo.

After the departure of Royal College, a new school was established on its former premises. Beginning with a few buildings, the school grew; Glendale Bungalow was endowed to the school with its  of land. In 1954, Prime Minister John Kotelawala opened the college main hall and two-storey building required by the rapid development of the college. In 1958, it was renamed Bandarawela Senior School; in 1972, Bandarawela Senior College became the Bandarwela Madya Maha Vidyalaya (Bandarawela Central College). In November 1986 BMMV became a national school, the only such school in Uva Province. In 1974 BMMV‘s primary school became Bandarawela Darmashoka Vidyalaya; in 1986  Dr. E. W. Adikaram Primary School, Bandarawela was established and it became the Primary of the Bandarawela Central College .

Status 
The school educates nearly 5,500 primary and secondary students in Sinhala and English; students may choose their language of instruction. It is administratively divided into two sections: primary (grades 1–5) and secondary (grades 6–13). The school provides housing for boys and girls. Its students have performed well in Ordinary and Advance Level Examinations, rating highly in provincial and island-wide rankings. BCC provides a variety of facilities, including science laboratories, an IT unit, a large playground, a library, auditoriums and sports facilities.

Houses 
Students of the school are divided into four houses, named by four renowned  Sri Lankan kings in the country's history:
 Gamunu
  Tissa
  Vijaya
 Abaya

Sports

Cricket

Golden Battle of Uva 

The Golden Battle of Uva is an annual cricket Big Match played against St. Joseph's College, Bandarawela, which was first played in 1996 at the school playground. It later moved to the Bandarawela Urban Council Playground, where it was played until 2003. After a seven-year hiatus from 2004 to 2011, the match was reorganised by the school Old Boys' Association in collaboration with St. Joseph's College and held at the Bandarawela Municipal Council Ground. At the end of the match, Bandarawela Central College won the trophy for the first time in match's history.

Principals

Notable alumni

References

 
National schools in Sri Lanka
Schools in Bandarawela